Castle Creek is a  long 3rd order tributary to the Hyco River in Person County, North Carolina.

Course
Castle Creek rises in a pond about 0.5 miles southwest of Gentry Store, North Carolina, and then flows north to join the Hyco River about 2 miles south-southeast of Harmony, Virginia.

Watershed
Castle Creek drains  of area, receives about 46.2 in/year of precipitation, has a wetness index of 373.81, and is about 55% forested.

References

Rivers of North Carolina
Rivers of Person County, North Carolina
Tributaries of the Roanoke River